Sweden competed at the 2004 Summer Paralympics in Athens, Greece. The team included 41 athletes, 32 men and 9 women. Competitors from Sweden won 21 medals, including 8 gold, 7 silver and 6 bronze to finish 21st in the medal table.

Medalists

Sports

Archery

Men

|-
|align=left|Anders Groenberg
|align=left|Men's individual W1
|661
|2
|N/A
|Bye
|W 102-102*
|W 99-96
|L 102-108
|
|}

Anders Groenberg's quarterfinal against Germany's Eric Hassberg was decided by additional arrows. Anders won 9:9, 8:8, 8:x and went through to the semifinals.

Athletics

Men's track

Men's field

Women's track

Cycling

Men's road

Equestrian

Team

Goalball
The men's goalball team won the silver medal after being defeated by Denmark in the gold medal final.

Players
Mikael Aspergen
Jimmy Bjoerkstrand
Niklas Hultqvist
Oskar Kuus
Mikael Rendahl
Boris Samuelsson

Tournament

Shooting

Men

Women

Swimming

Men

Women

Table tennis

Men

Women

Teams

Wheelchair tennis

See also
Sweden at the Paralympics
Sweden at the 2004 Summer Olympics

References 

Nations at the 2004 Summer Paralympics
2004
Summer Paralympics